Märta Norberg (19 September 1922 – 19 December 2020) was a Swedish cross-country skier who competed in the 1950s. She won two bronze medals in the 3 × 5 km relay at the FIS Nordic World Ski Championships (1954, 1958). She was born in Örnsköldsvik, Ångermanland. Norberg finished fourth in the 10 km event at the 1952 Winter Olympics in Oslo.

Cross-country skiing results

Olympic Games

World Championships
 2 medals – (2 bronze)

References

External links
World Championship results 

1922 births
2020 deaths
People from Örnsköldsvik Municipality
Cross-country skiers from Västernorrland County
Swedish female cross-country skiers
Olympic cross-country skiers of Sweden
Cross-country skiers at the 1952 Winter Olympics
FIS Nordic World Ski Championships medalists in cross-country skiing
20th-century Swedish women